Henry Clay McComas (December 21, 1875 – December 1958) was an American psychologist and skeptic.

McComas was born December 21, 1875 in Baltimore. He achieved his bachelor's degree at Johns Hopkins in 1897, his Masters at Columbia in 1898 and his Ph.D. at Harvard in 1910. He worked as an Assistant Professor of Psychology at Princeton University, he was also an editor for the Psychological Index.

McComas was a member of the American Society for Psychical Research, and took interest in exposing the fraud and trickery of mediums. He investigated William Cartheuser and Mina Crandon and concluded they were both fraudulent.

In his book Ghosts I Have Talked With (1937), McComas described his experiences in investigating spiritualism. His results were entirely negative. He found that chance, fraud or malobservation could explain all the phenomena.

He died in Florida in December 1958.

Publications

Some Types of Attention (1911)
The Psychology of Religious Sects: Comparison of Types (1912)
Apparatus for Recording Continuous Discrimination Reactions (1917)
The Aviator (1922)
Ghosts I Have Talked With (1937)
The McComas Saga: A Family History Down to the Year 1950 (1950)

References

1875 births
1958 deaths
20th-century American psychologists
American skeptics
Columbia University alumni
Critics of Spiritualism
Harvard University alumni
Johns Hopkins University alumni
Princeton University faculty